The 2024 G20 Brazil summit is the upcoming nineteenth meeting of Group of Twenty (G20), a summit scheduled to take place in Brazil in 2024.

Participating leaders

See also 
 2023 G20 New Delhi summit
 List of G20 summits

References

External links
 Official website of the G20 

2024
2024
2024 conferences
2024 in Brazil
2024 in international relations
2024